The 1999–2000 season was the 97th competitive season in Belgian football.

National team
Belgium qualified for the Euro 2000 as a host but could not even reach the quarter-finals.

* Belgium score given first

Key
 H = Home match
 A = Away match
 F = Friendly
 ECFR = UEFA European Championship, First Round
 og = own goal

Honours

See also
 Belgian First Division 1999-2000
 2000 Belgian Super Cup
 Belgian Second Division
 Belgian Third Division: divisions A and B
 Belgian Promotion: divisions A, B, C and D

References
 FA website - International results